Anton Lembit Soans (September 17, 1885 Oranienbaum, Russia – November 26, 1966 Tallinn, Estonia) was an Estonian architect, urban planner and lecturer. He was one of the founding members of the Estonian Architects Union.

Education and work experience 
In 1905, he graduated from the Tallinn Peter’s School of Science (now Tallinn Secondary School of Science). In Estonia, it was not possible to study architecture or engineering, so Anton Soans got his professional education at the Riga Polytechnic Institute (now Riga Technical University) in 1905–1913. At the same time, several other well-known names studied  architecture in Riga, such as Erich Jacoby and Karl Treumann-Tarvas, Herbert Johanson, Eugen Habermann, Ernest Kühnert (also graduates of Tallinn Secondary School of Science) and Edgar Johan Kuusik. This Riga group is considered to be the first generation of Estonian architects.

Due to the lack of architects, there was no corresponding organization in Estonia in the tsarist era. In 1921, 10 local architects, including Anton Soans, founded the Estonian Architects Association (now the Union of Estonian Architects).

Anton Soans had a very varied career. Specialist career began in St. Petersburg as a member of the Association of Apartment Buildings under the guide of Ernst Wierich, it was recommended to work with someone for a few years before becoming independent professional.

During World War I, he headed the construction of insurances and military buildings in Petrograd and in Tallinn.

1920–23 Tallinn Ministry of Agriculture
1923–28 Tallinn City Government Building Department
1928–32 Land Board
1933–36 National Mortgage Bank of Estonia
1936–40 Department of Construction, Department of Roads
1944–56 Architectural Design and Planning Center and senior architect "In the Estonian project"

Teacher active: 1924–34 at Tallinn Technical College, 1936–39 at the Tallinn Technical University and 1946-56 at the Estonian National Art Institute (now Estonian Academy of Arts).

Anton Soans as a city planner before World War II 
From 1923–28 he worked as a city architect at Tallinn City Architecture Department in the footsteps of Herbert Johanson. Soans' urban planning generally saw a lot of greenery, as the distribution of healthier lifestyles also increased the proportion of greenery in the city. Often this meant the creation of parks between the streets and the streets surrounded by trees. For example, the area between Narva and Tartu highways was completed under his supervision, including the plan of the Police Park, the plans for the area between Väike-Ameerikas, as well as Pärnu highway and the railway, which provided for several plantations  A good example of a garden city is the construction of Aarde and Preesi streets in Pelgulinna (1927), using H. Johanson's four typical projects (1929). Harald Arman has said: "This was one of the first fully integrated garden towns with small apartments."

1927–1928. the project "Air, Water and the Sun", which was created by Anton Soans, Edgar Kuusik and Frans de Vries, was awarded 1st Prize at the competition organized by the Pirita Coastal Planning Program.

During 1927–28 Toompea hillside and the mound was restored, a pedestrian walkway was built, a stadium at the center of the park with a service building for schools in the center of the city. A quadrilateral fountain designed by Anton Soans was constructed on the pond's shore, near which was built a rock-garden.

In 1928 was awarded the 1st Prize at the Kadrioru Park Reconstruction Competition. In 1935 Pelguranna Park Design Project.

Anton Soans was able to implement the principles of planning town planning in a good manner, taking into account the historical development of urban architecture, and thus actively involved in urban planning in smaller cities, towns, factory settlements and residential areas. In 1923 Soans made the first plan of Haapsalu, which foresaw it as a new management and shopping center (not performed), a more densely populated main street of Karja, a fire fighting house, a sanatorium specially for the resort and Läänemaa Gymnasium. In the same year, he designed, together with architect A. Eichhenhorn, a Tartu Ropka-Bishop Garden private district. In addition, there was work in the recreation areas in Sindi (1929), Rannamõisa (1929), Otepää, Vasalemma and Taevaskoja (1932). In 1925 a new mine was constructed on the edge of Kohtla-Järve, according to Anton Soans' general plan small dwellings and schoolhouses were built, wooden barracks and low-rise apartment buildings as dispersed groups (Hädaküla) and officials' houses (Siidisuka). He also designed a network of landscapes for a large pond in Kohtla-Järve, Pioneer Street and Pavandu houses.

Anton Soans as a city planner after World War II 
Soans’ urban planning intensified after World War II. A detailed plan for Mõisaküla private area was created with E. Habermann (1947). Then the post-war planning plans for Viljandi (1950), Narva, Põltsamaa (1955) and Valga (1956). Revival of Pärnu as a formerly gorgeous resort town, restoration of Tartu as a center for education and science (1945 with Peeter Tarvase, 1948, 1954 with J. Fomini and H. Arman, 1959 corrected) and Tallinn's new general plan (with O. Keppe and H. Arman, Option I, 1946, Revised 1950, was approved in 1952; Soviet Soviet Prize in 1948). The post-war reconstruction of Tallinn provided for the development of the city for 20 years. The first 5–6 years were spent on restoration work, not many new buildings were built. In 1946, the renovation of the theater and concert hall "Estonia" was started (finished 1950). In 1947-48 the Lenin (now Rävala blvd) avenue and the Estonian Red Hut (now Theater) square was created. The main focus was on the region most affected - the city center.

Anton Soans as an architect 
It is true that by the amount of work Anton Soans can mostly be seen as a city planner, but he has several magnificent architectural objects. He was willingly able to work with other architects, as a matter of fact all of Anton Soans's most famous houses were born as a collaboration.

First, he also tried his hand in the 1920s in traditionalism, but the most successful architects of this style were H. Johansson and E. Habermann. In the second half of the 20th century, clues began about Soans' ability to perform functionalist architecture (A.Soans, House of the Estonian Seed Farm, Tallinn, Pärnu mnt 2, an overhaul project, 1923; Long 36. 1921, O. Moeler, A. Soans, 1924–25, G. Hellat). At the end of the decade, an individual project was completed on A. Adamson's 4th street, office and residential building (1928–29).

Anton Soans was the planner of the Raua street dead-end segment, houses no. 25-35. Started in 1932 and completed in 1936, it is one of the most unique projects in Estonia. Additional architects for the buildings were to Richard Falkenberg, Johann Ostrat, Villem Seidra and Artur Veedemaa-Vetemaa. Its form of geometric volumes has similarity to the R. Mallet-Stevens' street in Paris, France. A. Soans' corner house had a shop a lower roof terrace like the Le Corbusier roof gardens. In 2015 it turned into a real estate development project called Villa Soans, in which the house was renovated and 9 apartments were sold.

In 1933, along with E. J. Kuusik, he designed the Tallinn Art Hall. This was a competition project, which was completed in 1934 with the financial support of Cultural Capital. A modernist aesthetic, featuring a large glass screen that combines exhibition halls, meeting rooms, and a number of studio windows. On the 1st floor of there was an Artists 'Club restaurant named KuKu and some commercial area, showrooms were on the 2nd floor, 3rd floor was for offices and on the top were artists' studio apartments. Due to the lack of space, in 1963, according to Kuusik's project, the building got an extra floor on top. The facade and showrooms were restored in 1995. Today the house serves the same purpose.

In the same year Soans designed an apartment building at Tõnismäe 16a, completed in 1936 

As with Kuusik, Soans collaborated with the Pärnu city architect Olev Siinmaa. Soans' creative contribution is doubtful, but he has signed both the Pärnu Beach Hotel (1935–1937) and the functionalist villa on  Lõuna street (1933–1936).

In 1936 the annex of the 19th-century wooden building of Koidula 32b was completed. The house has a robustly functionalistic elements, asymmetrical corner window frames, a round panorama wall and metal railings on balconies. It was an individual project.

The Võru Bank building began to rise on the corner of Tartu and Jüri Stin 1937 and was completed in 1939. It was again a collaboration with Kuusik. The house was classically structured - in a small town on the main square, three-stories, high-rise roof with a central two-floor operating hall, very dominant in the city. In the style of president Päts, it had elements of traditionalism, a modern house with plenty of decorations covering the facade. The facade also included iconic reliefs from marble by the sculptor Alexander Kaasik.

At the end of 1937, the Bank of Estonia announced the Pärnu bank house competition. In collaboration with Alar Kotl, Soans designed the winning project. The building was started in 1939, hoping to get ready during the same year, but the construction was slowed down by Second World War, it was finally finished in 1943. It was the largest house in Pärnu and one of the largest bank buildings in Estonia at that time. Reconstruction and style will inevitably be similar in appearance to the same agency, perhaps even more decorative. Today it is the headquarter for SEB Pärnu.

In 1938, Anton Soans designed a Russian Orthodox Church in Kohtla-Järve, Järveküla tee 7. Geometrically clear and modest from the main plan. It was the only Orthodox church built in Estonia during this decade. Despite the traditional details, the structure and form of the church are quite modern, it did not even have the onion tuber motive. Since 1998 it was added on the list of cultural monuments, but before that the church built a dome for the church.

A. Soans has also tried hand in designing memorials and one of the brighter examples is from 1939 a memorial pillar in Tahkuranna. Designed in collaboration with the sculptor Ferdi Sannamees, to mark the birthplace of Konstantin Päts.

He also designed the Pelgulinna Resort (destroyed in 1936), the Estonian Seedlings Community House (Valli St 1936), the Industrial Palace (1937 A. Kotli), the Fair Building (1937) and the English College (J Kunder and A Jansen, 37–38; all in Tallinn, but not built) and Pühajärve Holiday Home (only the administrative building was built in 1954).

List of creations 

 Haapsalu I Planning Scheme (1923)
 Tartu Ropka-Bishop garden city with A. Eichhenhorn (1923)
 Buildings of Aarde and Preesi Street in Pelgulinna with E. Habermann (1927)
 Merivälja garden city, 1st Place (1927).
 Pirita coastal planning plan with E.J Kuusik, 1st place (1927–28)
 Toompea park renewing (1927–28)
 Kadriorg Park transformation, 1st Place (1928)
 A. Adamson's 4 office and apartment building (1928–29)
 Sindi holiday village (1929)
 Rannamõisa recreation area (1929)
 Estonian Mortgage Bank with Karl Burman sen, II place (1930)
 Roosikrantsi 4b garden plan (1931)
 Vihula Elementary School with Karl Burman, Soans possibly only the signer (1931–32)
 Taevaskoja Holiday Village (1932)
 Villa in Pärnu, Lõuna 2a with O. Siinmaa, Soans possibly only the signer (1933)
 Estonian Art Museum with E. J. Kuusik, III place (1933)
 Tallinn Art Hall with E. J. Kuusik (1933–34)
 The Raua dead-end street: Raua 25 (1932) and 31 (1934)
 Pärnu Beach Hotel with Olev Siinmaa (1935)
 Pelgulinna beach (1935), destroyed
 Restoring and extension of Koidula 32b private house (1936)
 Tõnismäe 16a apartment building (1936)
 The building of the Estonian Seedlings Common House at Valli and Pärnu St corner (1936), not performed
 Fair House (1937)
 The industrial palace with A. Kotl in the corner of Roosikrantsi and Kaarli Blvd, 2 variants (1937), not performed
 Bank of Estonia Võru building with E.J Kuusik (1937–39)
 Bank of Estonia Pärnu building with A. Kotli (1937–43)
 English College next to Politseiaed park (1937–38)
 Järvakandi Elementary School (1938)
 Kohtla-Järve Workers' Union:
 Pioneer and Pavandu St buildings (1922–23)
 Buildings and park plan of the Siidisuka St with E. Habermann (1923–24)
 Kohtla-Järve elementary school Spordi 2 (1938–39)
 Järveküla 7 (1938), Russian Orthodox Church of the Transfiguration of the Lord
 Konstantin Päts Birthplace Memorial with Ferdin Sannameh (1939)
 Tallinn's new city plan with O. Keppe and H. Arman (1946–52):
 Lenin blvd (Rävala blvd) and Estonian Red Hoods Center (Theater Square) (1947–48)
 Planning of the Mõisaküla residential area with E. Habermann (1947)
 The post-war reconstruction of Tartu with Peeter Tarvase and H. Arman (1945–59)
 Post post-war reconstruction of Pärnu and Narva
 Post post-war reconstruction of Põltsamaa (1950)
 Holiday House in Pühajärve (only the administrative building headquarters was completed in 1954).
 Post post-war reconstruction of Valga (1956)

Personal exhibition 
September 18, 2012 –  November 7, 2010 the exhibition "Architect Anton Soans 125" took place in the salt basement big hall of the Estonian Architecture Museum, in which the curator was Matis Rodin and designer Marge Pervik-Kaal. The main part of the exhibition material came from the Soans personal fund at the Architecture Museum. [18]

Personal life 
His parents were Hans Soans and Amalie Rosalie Soans.

Married in 1930 Ellen Bachman, who worked as an accountant. They had two sons Eerik and Ado Soans, the first is a forest scientist and the younger one a civil engineer in civilian and industrial construction. His nephew was an artist Olev Soans, his brother's grandson is sculptor Jaak Soans.

References

1885 births
1966 deaths
People from Lomonosov
People from Petergofsky Uyezd
Estonian architects
Riga Technical University alumni